Soloman Brodsky (April 22, 1923 – June 4, 1984) was an American comic book artist who, as Marvel Comics' Silver Age production manager, was one of the key architects of the small company's expansion to a major pop culture conglomerate. He later rose to vice president, operations, and vice president, special projects. "Sol was really my right-hand man for years", described Marvel editor and company patriarch Stan Lee.

Brodsky worked primarily behind the scenes, uncredited. His accomplishments include co-creating, with letterer Artie Simek, the long-familiar logo of The Amazing Spider-Man, as well as other Marvel logos still in use in the mid-2000s. He was belatedly credited after decades as the inker of Jack Kirby's pencil art for The Fantastic Four #3-4 (March–May 1962) and many other landmark comics.

Lee described Brodsky as "my assistant for years and the company's production head. He could write, he could draw, he could ink — he could do everything."

Biography

Early life and career

Born in Brooklyn, New York City, New York, the son of Abraham and Dora Brodsky, Sol Brodsky was the eldest among siblings Leonard, Ted, and Faye. Determined early in life to pursue cartooning, he took a job sweeping floors at Archie Comics in order to break into the industry. A 1985 tribute feature in the Marvel promotional magazine Marvel Age (pictured above) cites his comic-art debut at age 17 in 1940 "in the comic V-Man" (sic; the comic was actually titled V •••—, using Morse Code, and in any event,  the two issues of that Fox Comics title starring the superhero V-Man were cover-dated January and March 1942).  Brodsky's earliest confirmed comics credit is inking a six-page Volton story in Holyoke Publishing's Cat-Man Comics vol. 3, #2, a.k.a. #12 (July 1942).

That year Brodsky began his long, if initially intermittent, association with Marvel, writing and drawing four one-page "Inky Dinky" gag strips in Mystic Comics #10 (Aug. 1942) and an additional one in Comedy Comics #11 (Sept. 1952), for the company's 1940s predecessor, Timely Comics. His earliest known cover art is for Holyoke's Blue Beetle #17 (Dec. 1942).

Brodsky served in the U.S. Army Signal Corps during World War II, advancing to the rank of corporal. The Marvel Age article reports he was stationed on the USS Fairfax, but that destroyer was decommissioned to become the British Royal Navy ship HMS Richmond on November 26, 1940, more than a year before the US entered the war.

Upon his return from military service, Brodsky created the feature "Red Cross" in Holyoke's aviation series Captain Aero Comics, where it ran as a backup from issues #21-25 (Dec. 1944 - Feb. 1946).

Fellow comics artist Allen Bellman recalled in 2005, "Sol and I were close friends. We both lived in Brooklyn and I was already married. ... When Roz and I were married, we moved to the Jersey shore area of Asbury Park, and Sol and his wife visited us often. He was a warm, good-natured person." Brodsky married Selma Cohen on November 28, 1948. Their first child, Janice, was born August 7, 1952, and son Gary on March 18, 1957.

Atlas Comics
Brodsky in late 1950 or early 1951 — the exact date uncertain due to his work often going unsigned, in the manner of the times — began penciling and inking for Marvel's 1950s forerunner, Atlas Comics. He is tentatively credited as cover artist of Marvel Boy #1-2 (Dec. 1950 - Feb.1951), and confirmably credited through the '50s for covers and occasional stories in issues of Atlas' horror/suspense titles Adventures into Weird Worlds, Strange Tales, and Uncanny Tales; the Westerns Kid Colt, Outlaw, Gunsmoke Western, Western Outlaws, and Wild Western; the satiric Crazy; and such miscellaneous genre titles as  Sports Action and Spy Fighters. He also drew the cover of Sub-Mariner Comics #34 (June 1954).

After an Atlas reorganization , publisher Martin Goodman eliminated all his comics-division staff except for editor-in-chief Stan Lee. Freelance cartoonist and later longtime Marvel colorist and Millie the Model artist Stan Goldberg recalled, "They needed someone on production to handle things since there was no real staff. I would come in a couple of days a week to help out, but I had a lot of my own freelance stuff, so I couldn't do much. Stan got in touch with Sol. Stan was a one-man department, and with Sol it became a two-man department." As Lee elaborated, "Sol and I were the whole staff of Atlas Comics. I bought the art and scripts and Sol did all the production. My job was mainly talking to the artists and the writers and telling them I wanted the stuff done. Sol did ... the corrections, making sure everything looked right, making sure things went to the engraver and he also talked to the printer. He was really the production manager. And then little by little we built things back up again."

During a 1957 economic entrenchment at the company, Goodman again fired the staff, except for Lee. Brodsky teamed with friend and fellow comic artist Mike Esposito to attempt launching a publishing company. Neither Brodsky's magazine prototypes, which included a rock and roll fan magazine, nor his travel kits for children, containing things to draw, play, and stay amused with during trips, found an investor.

Brodsky had much more success with a series of promotional comic books he created and produced for the Big Boy restaurant chain. Lee would script the majority of these. Brodsky also produced promotional comics for Bird's Eye frozen foods, featuring talking vegetables. In 1958, Brodsky became founding editor of the satirical magazine Cracked.

Marvel Comics
Until leaving Cracked in 1964 to become Marvel's production manager, Brodsky was concurrently freelancing for Marvel, inking The Fantastic Four #3 (the issue that introduced the team's costumes and other mythos sui generis) and #4 (the return of the Golden Age antihero the Sub-Mariner), among other covers/interiors. As Marvel began to expand with the success of Fantastic Four, The Amazing Spider-Man and other titles, Brodsky's organizational skills and easygoing manner led Lee, by now a friend for several years, to offer him the newly created, formal position of production manager in 1964. When artist Bill Everett, on his return to Marvel after many years in commercial art, turned in Daredevil #1 (April 1964) extremely late, Brodsky and Spider-Man artist Steve Ditko inked "a lot of backgrounds and secondary figures on the fly [and] cobbled the cover and the splash page together from Kirby's original concept drawing."

Roy Thomas described the Marvel offices in 1965 as "just three or four little rooms. Stan's office was as big as everything else put together, and Sol Brodsky, [secretary/receptionist] Flo Steinberg, and [artist/colorist/production person] Marie Severin were crowded into two other little rooms."

Some Marvel humor comics with art credited to Brodsky may not have been his work. As comics historian Mark Evanier notes:

Brodsky spent a few months away from Marvel in the early 1970s, when he and Israel Waldman co-founded Skywald Publications — the company name composed of truncated versions of their last names. Sometime before May 19, 1978 — the date of a letter, put up for auction years later, that he had sent to a Marvel fan — his title had become vice president, operations. Later, as vice president, special projects, he oversaw Marvel UK, Marvel Books, and other brand expansions. One-time Marvel editor-in-chief Jim Shooter recalled in 2011 that after Skywald went defunct, "Sol needed a job, and approached Stan [Lee], but a new Production Manager had been hired in Sol’s absence — John Verpoorten. Stan convinced the [then-parent company] Cadence [Industries] board to create a new position for Sol, 'V.P. of Operations'. Essentially, he was Stan's right-hand man again." Al Hewetson, who succeeded Brodsky as editor of Skywald, disputes this, recalling in 2004 that Brodsky had told him, "Marvel has made me an offer to go back and develop their overseas syndication, and I'm going to do it. This is a big opportunity." Brodsky's last credited issues as editor and Hewetson's first are cover-dated August 1972; Skywald's final magazines are cover-dated October 1974.

A fictionalized Brodsky is among the beachgoers gathered 'round the unconscious Namor in penciler Marie Severin's splash page for The Sub-Mariner #19 (Nov. 1969). As an in-joke, Severin had drawn the Marvel staff (as well as three personal friends) as onlookers. Brodsky is the man in the Hawaiian shirt at lower right, gesturing to the police (and standing in front of a cigar-smoking Mike Esposito).  A fictionalized Brodsky also appeared alongside Lee, Kirby and Steinberg — all transformed into a Marvel Bullpen version of the Fantastic Four — in the alternate-reality comic What If Vol. 1, #11 (Oct. 1978). Written and drawn by Kirby, the odd tale featured Brodsky as the Human Torch.

Brodsky's son Gary founded the short-lived, 1980s independent-comics company Solson Publications, which published an issue of the T.H.U.N.D.E.R. Agents update T.H.U.N.D.E.R., by writer Michael Sawyer and artist James E. Lyle, plus the short-lived "super-president" spoof series Reagan's Raiders. Brodsky's daughter, Janice Cohen, has been a Marvel colorist.

Occasional 1970s Marvel writer Allyn Brodsky, who served as assistant to editor-in-chief Stan Lee, following Al Hewetson, is not related.

Audio
Audio of Merry Marvel Marching Society record, including voice of Sol Brodsky, at Dograt.com. WebCitation archive.

References

External links

 The Comics Journal #92 (Aug. 1984): "Marvel Vice President/Administration Sol Brodsky Dies at Age of 61" p. 18
 Marvel Age #22 (Jan. 1985): "Sol Brodsky Remembered", by Dwight Jon Zimmerman, pp. 12–25

American comics artists
Comic book publishers (people)
Jewish American artists
People from Brooklyn
Silver Age comics creators
Marvel Comics people
Archie Comics
1923 births
1984 deaths
Artists from Brooklyn
United States Army personnel of World War II
United States Army non-commissioned officers